Klaus Waldeck is a music producer and performer based in Vienna, Austria. In addition to the music published under his stage name, Waldeck, his label Dope Noir Records has also released his music as Saint Privat, Waldeck Sextett and Soul Goodman.

History

As a young child in Vienna, Austria Klaus Waldeck took piano lessons. When he was fifteen his music life was put on hold when he destroyed a Bechstein piano while rewiring it.

Waldeck later attended law school, publishing his doctoral thesis on copyright law in 1994. While working as a copyright lawyer, he became aware of George Harrison being sued for copyright infringement.  That inspired him to produce music by altering existing melodies until they were no longer considered plagiarism.

Soon after deciding to leave law, he moved to England. In London, he met vocal musicians Joy Malcolm (Incognito) and Brian Amos (Pressure Drop) which whom he later collaborated on albums.

His 1996 EP Northern Lights includes a track, Aquarius, a remix of Age of Aquarius from Hair. Waldeck's albums and singles from 1998 through 2002 are out of print and therefore obscure and scarce.  By 2007 his Ballroom Stories album was released, featuring a new chief-chanteuse, the Austrian singer zeebee.

Together with singer Valérie Sajdik, Waldeck formed the group Saint Privat in 2002. Their first album Riviera was released in 2004.
After a six-year hiatus, Waldeck moved on from Electro Swing with his EP The Weatherman in the genre of broken beat. In 2016 he released his album Gran Paradiso which Waldeck labels as „Spaghetti & Western“ production.

In 2018 he released Atlantic Ballroom followed by Grand Casino Hotel both featuring the great singer Patrizia Ferrara. Many of Waldeck's tracks have been used in TV or advertising, such as Grey's Anatomy, Ferrero or Versace.

Genre
Waldeck's early releases have explored contemporary Downtempo and Trip hop trends. "Ballroom Stories" (2007), his greatest commercial success, has become the prototype of Electro swing, while his recent releases have increasingly featured analog sounds with a cinematographic mood.  Most of Waldeck's songs convey genre ambitions and a serene attitude.  Over his career, he has explored classical piano pieces, Swing, Country, Jazz, Latin, and many other genres. His varied oeuvre also reflects the recruitment of vocalists and collaborators like zeebee, Joy Malcolm, Brian Amos, Valérie Sajdik and Patricia Ferrara.

Discography

Albums

Northern Lights – EP (1996)
 Aquarius – 4.57
 Moon – 4.12
 Mask – 4.50
 Dreaming – 6.30
 Aquarius – 5.11
 Mask – 6.21

Balance of the Force (1998)
 Defenceless 	
 Spy Like An Angel
 Children Of The Ghetto
 Slaapwagen
 Aquarius
 Northern Lights
 Wake Up
 Superpopstar
 Death Of A Piano Salesman
 Moon

Balance of the Force Remixed (1998)
 Aquarius – Mushroom Dive, 5.06
 Children Of The Ghetto – Blackwing, 4.50
 Defenceless – Fauna Flash, 6.42
 Defenceless – Solar Moon, 5.36
 Spy Like An Angel, 7.21
 Wake Up – Mushroom Dive, 6.40
 Wake Up – Rockers Hi-Fi, 8.16
 You Only Live Twice, 5.25
 Northern Lights – Mushroom, 5.01
 Defenceless – Thievery Corp., 8.45
 Slaapwagen – Uptight Mix, 4.26

The Night Garden (2001)
 Slowly – 4.49
 The Night Garden – 5.36
 Tears Running Dry – 4.04
 Waiting – 5.10
 Fallen Angel – 5.01
 Cat People Dub – 4.32	
 Floater – 4.51
 I Talk To The Wind – 5.02 (cover version of King Crimson's song I Talk To The Wind)
 It Comes From You – 5.56
 Morning Light – 3.22
 This Isn't Maybe – 3.57

The Night Garden Reflowered (2002)
 This Isn't Maybe (Mushroom Dive's Lo Fly Push Up 2002) – 6.16
 Fallen Angel (Urbs Mix) – 4.31
 Slowly (Mushroom Dive's Frantic Ballroom Blitz) – 4.50
 I Talk To The Wind (Kid Loco Meets Orpheus Uptown Mix) – 5.32
 Cut More Cheese (Supercheese) – 4.00
 Floater (Dubblestandart Mix) – 6.26
 Tears Running Dry Part 1 (Mushroom Dive's Jazz Cut) – 5.21
 Tears Running Dry Part 2 (Herbert's Level Dub) – 5.43
 This Isn't Maybe (Mark's Underlevel Dub) – 5.38
 Catpeople Dub (Jung Collective Rehash) – 6.00
 Out Of Trumpets (Supercheese) – 4.03

Ballroom Stories (2007)
 Make My Day – 2.48
 Jerry Weintraub – 3.15
 Memories – 3.50
 Addicted – 3.50
 So Black & Blue – 3.25
 Midsummer Night Blues – 4.40
 Why Did We Fire The Gun? – 5.33
 Dope Noir – 4.15
 Get Up... Carmen – 4.03
 Bei Mir Bist Du Schön (Dub) – 4.11
 Our Day Will Come – 4.46

 Gran Paradiso (2016)
 Serenata Part I – 1.15
 Shala-lala-la (feat. la Heidi) – 3.15
 Rio Grande – 3.18
 Get On Uppa (feat. la Heidi) – 3.44
 Senorita Rodeo – 3.28
 Western Saloon Cartoon (feat. Mud) – 3.24
 Una Promessa (feat. la Heidi) – 2.50
 Bello Ciao (feat. la Heidi) – 3.27
 Brahms Lonely Mariachi – 2.52
 Illusione (feat. la Heidi) – 3.30
 Una Volta... (feat. la Heidi) – 2.27
 Chico (feat. la Heidi) – 2.38
 Rock & Rolle (feat. la Heidi) – 3.01

 Atlantic Ballroom (2018)
 Rough Landing (feat. Patrizia Ferrara) – 3:37
 Uno dos... Heisenberg – 2:31
 Keep my Fire Burning (feat. Joy Malcolm) – 1:58
 Stay Put (feat. Patrizia Ferrara) – 2:37
 Never Let You Go (feat. Patrizia Ferrara) – 3:13
 Quicksand (feat. Patrizia Ferrara) – 2:30
 Illusions (feat. Patrizia Ferrara) – 3:27
 Puerto Rico – 3:45
 Quando (feat. Patrizia Ferrara) – 2:58
 Bring my Baby Back Home (feat. Big John) – 2:47
 Waltz for Nathalie – 1:49
 Freedom (feat. Joy Malcolm) – 2:50

Singles
Aquarius (1997)
Wake Up (1997)
Children of the Ghetto (1998)
Defenceless (1999)
This Isn't Maybe (2000)
This Isn't Maybe (12" release) (2002)
Tears Running Dry (2002)
Make My Day (2006)

References

External links
Klaus Waldeck's official site

Austrian male musicians
Living people
Trip hop musicians
Austrian electronic musicians
Ambient musicians
Downtempo musicians
Electro swing musicians
Year of birth missing (living people)